NBC 2 may refer to one of the following television stations in the United States:

Current
KJRH-TV, Tulsa, Oklahoma
KPRC-TV, Houston, Texas
KNAZ-TV, Flagstaff, Arizona
KNOP-TV, North Platte, Nebraska
KOTI, Klamath Falls, Oregon
KSNC, Great Bend, Kansas
Re-broadcasts KSNW in Wichita, Kansas
KTUU-TV, Anchorage, Alaska
WBBH-TV, Fort Myers / Naples, Florida (cable channel; broadcasts on channel 22)
WCBD-TV, Charleston, South Carolina
WDTN, Dayton, Ohio
WESH, Orlando, Florida
WGRZ, Buffalo, New York
 WKAQ-DT3, a digital subchannel of WKAQ-TV in San Juan, Puerto Rico (O&O)
WKTV, Utica, New York
WLBZ, Bangor, Maine
WTWO, Terre Haute, Indiana

Former
K07ZK/KOTR-LP (now KOTR-LD), Monterey, California
Was a translator of KSBW in Monterey, California
KATN, Fairbanks, Alaska (1955 to 1996)
KHBC-TV (now KSIX-TV), Hilo, Hawaii (1996 to 2009)
Was a re-broadcast of KHNL in Honolulu, Hawaii
KHON-TV, Honolulu, Hawaii (1952 to 1996)
KJWY, Jackson, Wyoming (now WDPN-TV in Wilmington, Delaware; affiliated with NBC from 1996 to 2009)
KLRJ-TV/KORK-TV (now KSNV), Las Vegas, Nevada (was on channel 2 from 1955 to 1967)
KMID (TV), Midland, Texas (1953 to 1981)
KTWO-TV, Casper, Wyoming (1957 to 2003)
KUTV, Salt Lake City, Utah (1960 to 1995)
WBRZ-TV, Baton Rouge, Louisiana (1955 to 1977)
WMAR, Baltimore, Maryland (1981 to 1995)
WSB-TV, Atlanta, Georgia (1948 to 1980)